Josep "Pep" Setvalls Morera (born 20 August 1974 in Navarcles, Barcelona, Catalonia) is a Spanish retired footballer who played as a central midfielder.

References

External links

1974 births
Living people
People from Bages
Sportspeople from the Province of Barcelona
Spanish footballers
Footballers from Catalonia
Association football midfielders
La Liga players
Segunda División players
Tercera División players
FC Barcelona C players
FC Barcelona Atlètic players
FC Barcelona players
UE Lleida players
Rayo Vallecano players
Levante UD footballers
Real Murcia players
FC Cartagena footballers